Salamina is a town and municipality in the Colombian department of Caldas.  It is located north of the department and has a township called San Felix. It was declared a national monument and historic heritage of mankind.

Salamina was founded in 1825 by Fermin Lopez,  Francisco Marulanda and others. Salamina is known as the "city of light" because there Caldas has produced many poets, musicians, actors and writers. It is also known as "Mother of Nations" because it was one of the centers from where the founders and first settlers of Neira, Aranzazu, Manizales, Santa Rosa de Cabal, Pereira, Armenia, among others parted. It was elevated to a municipality in 1861.

It has a population of about 20,000 inhabitants, an area of 40,354 hectares and an average temperature of 22 °C (71.6 °F). Its economy is based on coffee and raise livestock and dairy.

Salamina was named a Pueblo Patrimonio (heritage town) of Colombia in 2010. It is the only municipality in the Eje Cafetero that was selected to be part of the Red Turística de Pueblos Patrimonio original cohort. In addition, the town was named part of the "Coffee Cultural Landscape" UNESCO World Heritage Site in 2011.

References 

Municipalities of Caldas Department